Elizabeth Cosgriff-Hernandez is an American biomedical engineer who is a professor at the University of Texas at Austin. Her work involves the development of polymeric biomaterials for medical devices and tissue regeneration. She also serves on the scientific advisory board of ECM Biosurgery and as a consultant to several companies on biostability evaluation of medical devices.
Cosgriff-Hernandez is an associate editor of the Journal of Materials Chemistry B and Fellow of the International Union of Societies for Biomaterials Science and Engineering, Biomedical Engineering Society, Royal Society of Chemistry, and the American Institute for Medical and Biological Engineering.

Early life and education 
Cosgriff-Hernandez was an undergraduate student at Case Western Reserve University, majoring in biomedical engineering. She focused on macromolecular science and engineering for her graduate studies, where she worked under the supervision of Anne Hiltner and Jim Anderson. Cosgriff-Hernandez was appointed a UT-TORCH postdoctoral fellow at Rice University, where she focussed on orthopaedic tissue engineering under the direction of Tony Mikos.

Research and career 
In 2007, Cosgriff-Hernandez moved to Texas A&M University as an assistant professor. She moved to the University of Texas at Austin as the L.B. (Preach) Meaders Professor in Engineering in 2017. Her laboratory specializes in strategic biomimicry to improve clinical outcomes of medical devices in the areas of orthopaedics, cardiovascular, and chronic wound healing. She integrates fundamental polymer science and tissue engineering to synthesize new materials and tailor fabrication methods to enhance scaffold complexity and function. Synthesis of hybrid biomaterials with targeted integrin interactions is complemented by advanced scaffold fabrication strategies. In addition to providing improved tissue grafts, these innovative biomaterials provide new tools to probe complex processes of tissue remodeling.

Alongside her research on novel materials, Cosgriff-Hernandez is involved with initiatives to promote equity and diversity within the sciences. She has served on the Diversity Committee of the Biomedical Engineering Society, DEI Committee of the Society for Biomaterials, and Chair of the Women's Initiatives Committee of the American Institute of Chemical Engineers. In 2020, she partnered with Kelly Stevens, Karmella Haynes, Lola Eniola-Adefeso to investigate disparities in National Institutes of Health funding for Black researchers.

Awards and honors 
 2016 Dean of Engineering Excellence Award
 2017 Elected Fellow to the American Institute for Medical and Biological Engineering (AIMBE)
 2020 Gilbreth Lecturer, National Academy of Engineering
 2020 Elected Fellow to the International Union of Societies for Biomaterials Science and Engineering
 2020 Elected Fellow to the Biomedical Engineering Society
 2021 Elected Fellow to the Royal Society of Chemistry

Selected publications

References

External links

https://chlab.bme.utexas.edu/

Living people
Year of birth missing (living people)
American biomedical engineers
University of Texas at Austin faculty
Fellows of the American Institute for Medical and Biological Engineering
Academic journal editors
Case Western Reserve University alumni